"Hands on Me" is a song on Vanessa Carlton's third studio album, Heroes & Thieves (2007), and is the album's second single. According to the website FMQB.com, it was released to mainstream contemporary hit radio in the United States on February 19, 2008 (see 2008 in music). It was mentioned as a possible choice for the second single in a June 2007 article in Entertainment Weekly, which wrote that it "sounded tailor-made for a rom-com trailer coming soon to a theater near you." Irv Gotti, the head of Carlton's label, The Inc. Records, was quoted as saying that the song reminded him of the 1985 film The Breakfast Club.

Carlton debuted the song live in June 2005 at The Living Room in New York City. One of its working titles was "Put Your Hands on Me", about which Slant Magazine wrote:

The title was shortened to "Hands on Me" because Joss Stone has a song with the original title on her 2007 album, Introducing Joss Stone.

Critical reception

Billboard has also given "Hands on Me" a positive review, stating that the "chorus gallops alongside plentiful piano strings, percussion and one hook after another, while the lyric taps into earnest desire".  In their review, the magazine also noted that due to the lack of airplay for Carlton's recent singles, this song has to "wrap itself around radio to keep this talented artist relevant".

Another critic, Jonathon Newan, stated "Hands on Me is a worthy successor of Carlton's late and unfortunately unsuccessful White Houses; nonetheless, it shows earnest[ness], honesty, and raw compassion - it's a beautiful song sung by a beautifully humble artist."

Music video
The music video was filmed in December 2007. It premiered February 15, 2008 on Yahoo! Music.

Charts

Credits and personnel

Vanessa Carlton: Piano, Keyboards, vocals, group vocals
Tony Fredianelli: guitar
Jon Evans: bass
Matt Chamberlain: drums, percussion
Stephan Jenkins: percussion, group vocals, string arrangements
Carl Kihlstedt: orchestrator
Melissa Reese: background and group vocals
Dionzya Sutton: group vocals
Lyn Berry: group vocals

Notes

2007 songs
2008 singles
Vanessa Carlton songs
Songs written by Stephan Jenkins
Songs written by Vanessa Carlton